The 2011–12 Oakland Golden Grizzlies men's basketball team represented Oakland University during the 2011–12 NCAA Division I men's basketball season. The Golden Grizzlies, led by 28th year head coach Greg Kampe, played their home games at the Athletics Center O'rena and are members of The Summit League. They finished the season 20–16, 11–7 in Summit League play to finish in third place. They lost in the quarterfinals of The Summit League Basketball tournament to Southern Utah. They were invited to the 2012 CollegeInsider.com Postseason Tournament where they defeated Bowling Green, Buffalo, and Rice en route to the semifinals before falling to Utah State.

Roster

Schedule

|-
!colspan=9 style=| Exhibition

|-
!colspan=9 style=| Regular season

|-
!colspan=9 style=| Summit League tournament

|-
!colspan=9 style=| CollegeInsider.com tournament

References

Oakland Golden Grizzlies men's basketball seasons
Oakland
Oakland
Oakland
Oakland